The Mindoro hornbill (Penelopides mindorensis) is a species of hornbill in the family Bucerotidae. It is endemic to forests on Mindoro in the Philippines found in tropical moist lowland forests. As is the case with all Philippine tarictic hornbills, it was once considered a subspecies of P. panini. It is the only tarictic hornbill where both sexes are creamy-white and black. The sexes are very similar, differing primarily in the colour of the ocular ring (pinkish-white in the male, blue in the female). It is threatened by habitat loss, and is consequently considered endangered by the IUCN.

Description 
EBird describes the bird as "A fairly large bird of lowland and foothill forest on Mindoro. Small for a hornbill. Bill fairly short with black bands. Has black wings, a pale buffy tail with black tip, pale underparts and head with a black cheek, and bare skin around the face and chin. Male has pinkish facial skin, while female’s is blue. Unmistakable. The only hornbill on Mindoro. Voice is a short nasal bark, “wak!”."

It is unique among the tarictic hornbills (Visayan hornbill, Luzon hornbill, Samar hornbill and Mindanao hornbill), which the others show a great deal of sexual dimorphism in which males have white heads and breasts while females are almost uniformly black. In the case of the Mindoro Hornbill, both males and females have white heads and bellies with the only physical features to distinguish sexes being the facial skin in which the females' are blue with the male's being pink in color.

Like all hornbills, they are cavity nesters and rely on large dipterocarp trees for breeding.

They are primarily frugivorous eating figs and berries but they are also known to eat insects, lizards and other small animals.

Habitat and Conservation Status 
It is found mostly in tropical moist primary lowland forest up to 1,000. They are also seen in secondary forest and forest edge but they need the large trees to support their nesting habits.

The IUCN Red List classifies this bird as an endangered species with population estimates of 250 to 999 mature individuals which is the lowest estimate among all five tarictic species. It is threatened by habitat loss with Mindoro having a great loss of forest in recent decades. By 1988, extensive deforestation on Mindoro had reduced forest cover to a mere 120 km2, of which only a small proportion is below this species's upper altitudinal limit. The lowland forest that does remain is highly fragmented and is still under threat. Kaingin or Slash-and-burn cultivation, occasional selective logging and rattan collection threaten the forest fragments that still support the species. Dynamite blasting for marble is an additional threat to forest at Puerto Galera. Hunting and poaching are also considered as significant threats.

It occurs in a few protected areas including Mt. Iglit-Baco National Park, where it shares habitat with the iconic Tamaraw and in Mt. Siburan in Sablayan which has been declared an Important Bird Area.

Conservation actions proposed include more surveys in areas where they have been reported to better understand the population, create formal protection in other sites where they are found in Malpalon, Puerto Galera and Manamlay Lake.

References

3. ^Dutson, Guy C.L. Evans, Tom D. Brooks, Thomas M. Asane, Desiderio C. Timmins, Robert J. Toledo, Angela. (1992). Conservation status of birds on Mindoro, Philippines. Bird Conservation International, (2) 4, 303–325.

External links
 BirdLife Species Factsheet.
 https://www.cambridge.org/core/services/aop-cambridge-core/content/view/91C5D2394C93C7C605FE69B97552873E/S0959270900002513a.pdf/conservation_status_of_birds_on_mindoro_philippines.pdf

Mindoro hornbill
Birds of Mindoro
Mindoro hornbill
Mindoro hornbill
Taxonomy articles created by Polbot
Birds of the Philippines
Endangered species